Songpu Singsit (born 2 June 1999) is an Indian professional footballer who plays as a winger for Sreenidi Deccan in the I-League.

Career
Singsit began his professional career with NEROCA in the I-League and made his debut against Aizawl on 30 January 2020. Singsit scored three goals in his debut season in the I-League and was voted as the Fans' Emerging player of the season.

East Bengal
On 7 September 2021, Songpu Singsit joined Indian Super League club East Bengal on a one-year deal.

Career statistics

Club

References

External links
 

1996 births
Living people
NEROCA FC players
Association football midfielders
Footballers from Manipur
I-League players
Indian footballers
East Bengal Club players
Sreenidi Deccan FC players